Graham Dunn (born 11 March 1950) is an Australian former swimmer. He competed in two events at the 1968 Summer Olympics.

References

External links
 

1950 births
Living people
Australian male butterfly swimmers
Olympic swimmers of Australia
Swimmers at the 1968 Summer Olympics
Swimmers from Sydney
Commonwealth Games medallists in swimming
Commonwealth Games silver medallists for Australia
Swimmers at the 1966 British Empire and Commonwealth Games
20th-century Australian people
Medallists at the 1966 British Empire and Commonwealth Games